K Theory is an electronic hip-hop act by Dylan Lewman, which formerly included Dustin Musser and Malcolm Anthony. The group was founded by Dylan Lewman and Dustin Musser in 2011. They have created remixes for Flo Rida's "GDFR", Rich Homie Quan's "Flex" and Fetty Wap's "Trap Queen".

Career 

On January 10, 2017, former K Theory member Malcolm Anthony left K Theory, citing "years of creative differences."

Discography

Extended plays

Remixes 

In 2015 their remix of Flo Rida's "GDFR" sold over 80,000 units on Atlantic Records.

New Trinity Music Group (Record Label) 

In 2015, K Theory formed their own label calling it New Trinity Music Group. The label released two tracks a week in 2015 including their 2nd Annual 25 Days of Kristmas campaign where they release 25 tracks in 25 days.

References

External links 
  K Theory's Soundcloud

American hip hop groups